Scipio Africanus Kenner, usually known as S. A. Kenner (1852–1913) was an editor and politician in territorial and early statehood Utah.

Kenner was born in Saint Francisville, Missouri and came to Utah with a Mormon pioneer company in 1860.  He was baptized a member of The Church of Jesus Christ of Latter-day Saints in 1865.  In 1871 Kenner married Isabella Park, whom he had become acquainted with while involved in dramatic productions in Salt Lake City.  They eventually became the parents of nine children.

Kenner worked as a telegraph operator and then as a journeyman at Deseret News.  He eventually became an editor at the newspaper.  At times he was the editor for both the Provo Times and the Ogden Standard.

Kenner was admitted to the bar after studying under George Sutherland. He worked as a city attorney, attorney for The Church of Jesus Christ of Latter-day Saints, assistant U.S. attorney, and served as a member of the Utah State Legislature.  The books he authored include The Practical Politician and Utah As It Is.

The town of Scipio, Utah was named in his honor.

References

Sources 
 Richard H. Cracroft and Neal E. Lambert, ed., A Believing People: Literature of the Latter-day Saints (Provo: Brigham Young University Press, 1974) p. 83.
 B. H. Roberts. Comprehensive History of The Church. Vol. 4, p. 149.
 Andrew Jenson. Encyclopedic History of the Church. p. 188.
 Andrew Jenson. LDS Biographical Encyclopedia. Vol. 2, p. 278

Latter Day Saints from Utah
American newspaper editors
Members of the Utah House of Representatives
Politicians from Salt Lake City
1852 births
1913 deaths
19th-century American politicians